Capo Mannu is a promontory in Sardinia, Italy.

The cape is situated in the territory of the Comune of San Vero Milis, in the Province of Oristano, approximately 22 km north of Oristano. It is also the northern tip of the Sinis peninsula, and it is part of the Marine Protected Area Sinis Peninsula and the island of Mal di Ventre.

Sport
Capo Mannu is renowned attraction for surfers, windsurfers and kiters, both nationally and internationally. The mistral, the dominant wind of the area, gives rise to waves up to 4–5 metres high. Every year, several surfing, windsurfing and kiteboarding competitions take place in the area, the most well known probably being the Capo del Capo (Chief of the Cape) windsurfing and kitesurfing competition.

Landforms of Sardinia
Tourist attractions in Sardinia
Mannu